Taxandria parviceps, commonly known as tea tree, is a shrub species that grows on the south west coast of Western Australia. This plant was previously classified as Agonis parviceps but is now part of the Taxandria genus.

Description
It blooms between July and October producing white flowers.
It can be grown as an ornamental shrub in the garden where it is hardy and has dense foliage. The small white flowers grow in masses and the foliage is aromatic. The shrub is drought tolerant once established and will also tolerate light frosts.

Distribution
It is often found along the edges of seasonally-wet areas on sand dunes and flats. It has a range along coastal regions extending from the South West region into the Great Southern region where it grows in loamy, sandy or clay soils over quartzite or granite.

Classification
First formally described as Agonis parviceps by the botanist Johannes Conrad Schauer in 1844 as part of  Johann Georg Christian Lehmann's work Plantae Preissianae The plant was subsequently reclassified to T. parviceps in a 2007 revision by Wheeler and Marchant into the new genus Taxandria.

References

parviceps
Myrtales of Australia
Rosids of Western Australia
Trees of Australia
Trees of Mediterranean climate
Plants described in 1844